Leandro Carvalho da Silva (born 10 May 1995), known as Leandro Carvalho, is a Brazilian footballer who plays as forward for Saudi club Ceará.

Club career
Born in Belém, Leandro Carvalho represented Paysandu as youth. Promoted to the first team ahead of the 2014 season, he made his senior debut on 19 January of that year by coming on as a second-half substitute in a 2–2 Campeonato Paraense away draw against Paragominas.

Leandro Carvalho scored his first goal as a senior on 2 February 2014, netting the fifth in a 6–0 home routing of São Francisco-PA. He featured regularly during the year, but appeared rarely in the following campaign due to an indiscipline problem.

On 8 January 2016, Leandro Carvalho was loaned to Penapolense until the end of the year's Campeonato Paulista Série A2. After featuring regularly, he served subsequent loans at Linense and Carajás before returning to Papão in November 2016 due to another indiscipline problem.

On 1 August 2017, Leandro Carvalho moved to fellow second division side Ceará, on loan until the end of the season. The following 1 January, after achieving promotion to Série A, he signed a three-year deal with Botafogo also in the main category.

On 6 July 2018, after being rarely used, Leandro Carvalho returned to Ceará on loan until December. The following 28 February, he signed a permanent three-year contract with the latter club.

On 12 February 2021, Leandro Carvalho moved to fellow top tier side América-MG, on a loan deal until December 2021. On 26 July, after several indiscipline problems, his loan was cut short and he joined Al-Qadsiah also in a temporary deal.

Career statistics

Honours
Paysandu
Campeonato Paraense: 2016
Botafogo
 Campeonato Carioca: 2018

References

External links

1995 births
Living people
Sportspeople from Belém
Brazilian footballers
Association football forwards
Campeonato Brasileiro Série A players
Campeonato Brasileiro Série B players
Campeonato Brasileiro Série C players
Saudi First Division League players
Paysandu Sport Club players
Clube Atlético Penapolense players
Clube Atlético Linense players
Ceará Sporting Club players
Botafogo de Futebol e Regatas players
América Futebol Clube (MG) players
Al-Qadsiah FC players
Clube Náutico Capibaribe players
Clube do Remo players
Expatriate footballers in Saudi Arabia
Brazilian expatriate sportspeople in Saudi Arabia